Old East Historic District is a national historic district located at Attica, Fountain County, Indiana. The district encompasses 43 contributing buildings and 2 contributing structures in a predominantly residential section of Attica.  It developed between about 1865 and 1930, and includes notable examples of Late Victorian, Tudor Revival, and Italian Villa style architecture.  Notable contributing buildings include the Holmes House (1877), Meharry House (1908), Colvert House (1901), and McDermond House (1897).

It was listed on the National Register of Historic Places in 1990.

References

Historic districts on the National Register of Historic Places in Indiana
Victorian architecture in Indiana
Tudor Revival architecture in Indiana
Italianate architecture in Indiana
Houses in Fountain County, Indiana
Historic districts in Fountain County, Indiana
National Register of Historic Places in Fountain County, Indiana